Commodore Sir Atwell Henry Lake, 9th Baronet,  (13 February 1891 – 27 November 1972) was a senior officer in the Royal Navy and the second Chief of Naval Staff of the Royal New Zealand Navy, serving from June 1942 to July 1945.

Lake was born in 1891. His parents were Admiral Atwell Peregrine Macleod Lake (1842–1915) and Constance Mary Turner. Sir Henry Atwell Lake was his grandfather.

On 30 June 1927, he was promoted from lieutenant commander to commander. On 31 December 1932, he was promoted from commander to captain. He was appointed a Commander of the Legion of Merit, a military award of the United States Armed Forces, and was granted unrestricted permission by the King to wear this award in 1946. In the 1945 New Year Honours, he was made a Companion of the Order of the Bath (CB).

References

1891 births
1972 deaths
Commanders of the Legion of Merit
Companions of the Order of the Bath
Officers of the Order of the British Empire
Baronets in the Baronetage of Great Britain
People from Greenwich
Royal Navy officers of World War I
Royal Navy officers of World War II
Foreign recipients of the Legion of Merit
Royal New Zealand Navy personnel of World War II